Napoleon is a 2017 Indian Telugu-language thriller film directed by Anand Ravi starring himself, Komalee Prasad and Ravi Varma.

Cast 
Anand Ravi as Napoleon 
Komalee Prasad as Sravanthi
Ravi Varma as the circle inspector

Production 
Writer Anand Ravi, who previously worked on Prathinidhi (2014), decided to make his acting debut with this film.

Reception 
A critic from Cinema Express opined, "The film, which tells the story of a man who has all kinds of quirks, starts out strong but loses the plot in the second half". A critic from The Week wrote, "The movie makes for an interesting watch but slightly drags in the second half". A critic from 123telugu said, "On the whole, Napoleon is a crime thriller which has some interesting moments here and there".

References